Jérémy Chardy was the defending champion but chose not to compete.
Daniel Gimeno-Traver won the title after defeating Jan-Lennard Struff 6–4, 6–2 in the final.

Seeds

Draw

Finals

Top half

Bottom half

References
 Main Draw
 Qualifying Draw

Singles